Novosphingobium indicum  is a bacterium from the genus Novosphingobium which has been isolated from deep-sea water from the Indian Ocean. Novosphingobium indicum hasd the ability to degrade polycyclic aromatic hydrocarbon.

References

External links
Type strain of Novosphingobium indicum at BacDive -  the Bacterial Diversity Metadatabase	

Bacteria described in 2009
Sphingomonadales